Mezhdurechensk (Suƣarazь-tura) is a city in Kemerovo Oblast, Russia. Population:

History
It was established in 1948 and granted town status in 1955.

Aeroflot Flight 593 crashed near the city in 1994.

Victory Day celebrations were cancelled in the city after the nearby Raspadskaya mine explosion killed 91 people in 2010.

Administrative and municipal status
Within the framework of administrative divisions, Mezhdurechensk serves as the administrative center of Mezhdurechensky District, even though is not a part of it. As an administrative division, it is incorporated separately as Mezhdurechensk City Under Oblast Jurisdiction—an administrative unit with a status equal to that of the districts. As a municipal division, the territories of Mezhdurechensk City Under Oblast Jurisdiction and of Mezhdurechensky District are incorporated as Mezhdurechensky Urban Okrug.

Notable people
Alexander Arbachakov, environmentalist
Elmira Abdrazakova, Miss Russia 2013
Sergei Kosmynin, European judo champion 1993 and 1994
Arthur Kulkov, Russian male model
Ilya Sorokin, Russian professional ice hockey goaltender for the New York Islanders

References

Notes

Sources

External links
Official website of Mezhdurechensk 
Pictures of Mezhdurechensk

Cities and towns in Kemerovo Oblast